El Cacao is a corregimiento in Capira District, Panamá Oeste Province, Panama with a population of 4,951 as of 2010. Its population as of 1990 was 4,042; its population as of 2000 was 4,387.

References

Corregimientos of Panamá Oeste Province